The La Recherche Expedition of 1838 to 1840 was a French Admiralty expedition whose destination was the North Atlantic and Scandinavian islands, including the Faroe Islands, Spitsbergen and Iceland.

The expedition in the Scandinavian countries from 1838 to 1840, was a direct continuation of shipments in 1835 and 1836. A letter dated 22 March 1837 revealed that Joseph Paul Gaimard and Xavier Marmier were preparing a trip to Copenhagen and Christiania (Norway) whose purpose was to gather additional information on Iceland and Greenland.

On 13 June 1838 the French corvette La Recherche left Le Havre in France, bound for Northern Scandinavia.  Joseph Paul Gaimard (1796–1858), a physician and zoologist was the commanding officer of the expedition.  The expedition was on a purely scientific nature, rather than a colonial venture in cooperation with the governments of Norway and Sweden.  Gaimard invited the Sámi minister and botanist Lars Levi Læstadius on the voyage for his knowledge in botany and Sámi culture. Auguste Bravais, a French scientist and Louis Bévalet, a French artist, also accompanied the expedition. The company was given an international dimension. Gaimard had hired many renowned European scholars. The Arctic exploration in the 1870s marked a watershed in the history of international scientific cooperation. The first evidence of this cooperation was, in 1882, the International Polar Year.

Publications

Vol. 1, part 1. Preface & Chapitre I, p. 1-286 http://archimer.ifremer.fr/doc/00002/11348/7917.pdf
Vol. 1, rest of Chapitre I, p. 287-564 http://archimer.ifremer.fr/doc/00002/11348/7917.pdf
Vol. 2, part. 1. Chapitre II & III  p. 1 - 248 http://archimer.ifremer.fr/doc/00002/11356/7929.pdf
Vol. 2, part 2. Chapitre IV p. 249 - 448  http://archimer.ifremer.fr/doc/00002/11357/7930.pdf
Vol. 3, part 1. Chapitre V, Variations de l'Intensité magnétique verticale, Chapitre VI, Variations de l'inclinaison magnétique, Chapitre VII, Mesures de l'inclinaison magnétique. Chapitre VIII, Variations simultanées des éleménts du magnétisme terrestre  p. 1-250 http://archimer.ifremer.fr/doc/00002/11358/7931.pdf
Vol. 3, part 2., s. 249-497 Chapitre IX, Électricité atmosphérique http://archimer.ifremer.fr/doc/00002/11359/7932.pdf

See also
Fragments of Lappish Mythology
Lars Levi Læstadius

References

Late modern Europe
1830s in science
1838 in Europe
1839 in Europe
1840 in Europe
Atlantic expeditions
European expeditions
Expeditions from France